Mark Rice-Oxley is a British journalist. He is an editor and columnist at The Guardian newspaper, whose credits include award-winning work such as WikiLeaks, Qatar's World Cup Slaves 
 and the Shirt on Your Back 
.

Rice-Oxley is the author of Underneath the Lemon Tree, an autobiography that describes his journey through depression and recovery.

References

1969 births
English male journalists
Living people
The Guardian journalists